The 6th British Academy Film Awards, retroactively known as the British Academy Film Awards, given by the British Academy of Film and Television Arts (BAFTA) (previously the British Film Academy) in 1953, honoured the best films of 1952. The Sound Barrier won the award for Best Film.

Winners and nominees

Best Film
 The Sound Barrier
The African Queen
Angels One Five
The Boy Kumasenu
Carrie
Casque d'or
Cry, The Beloved Country
Death of a Salesman
Limelight
Mandy
Miracolo a Milano
Los Olvidados
Outcast of the Islands
Rashomon
The River
Singin' in the Rain
A Streetcar Named Desire
Viva Zapata!

Best Foreign Actor
 Marlon Brando in Viva Zapata! 
Humphrey Bogart in The African Queen
Fredric March in Death of a Salesman
Pierre Fresnay in Dieu a besoin des hommes
Francesco Golisano in Miracolo a Milano

Best British Actor
 Ralph Richardson in The Sound Barrier 
Laurence Olivier in Carrie
Alastair Sim in Folly to Be Wise
Jack Hawkins in Mandy
James Hayter in The Pickwick Papers
Nigel Patrick in The Sound Barrier

Best British Actress
 Vivien Leigh in A Streetcar Named Desire 
Celia Johnson in I Believe In You
Phyllis Calvert in Mandy
Ann Todd in The Sound Barrier

Best Foreign Actress
 Simone Signoret in Casque d'or 
Nicole Stephane in Les Enfants Terribles
Judy Holliday in The Marrying Kind
Edwige Feuillère in Olivia
Katharine Hepburn in Pat and Mike

Best Documentary Film
Royal Journey

Best British Film
 The Sound Barrier 
Angels One Five
Cry, The Beloved Country
Mandy
Outcast of the Islands

UN Award
 Cry, The Beloved Country

Most Promising Newcomer To Film
 Claire Bloom  in Limelight 
Dorothy Tutin in The Importance of Being Earnest
Dorothy Alison in Mandy
Mandy Miller in Mandy

Film006
1953 in British cinema
1952 film awards
March 1953 events in the United Kingdom
1953 in London